Jed Brophy (born 29 October 1963) is an actor from New Zealand.  He has appeared in several of  Peter Jackson's films, including Braindead, Heavenly Creatures, The Lord of the Rings film trilogy, and King Kong.  Brophy also appears as the dwarf Nori in The Hobbit films.

Biography 
Brophy was born in Taihape in 1963. He grew up in Mataroa and went to school at Mataroa Primary School and Palmerston North Boys' High School.

He was educated at Toi Whakaari: New Zealand Drama School, graduating in 1987 with a Diploma in Acting. He started acting in stage productions in Wellington in the 1980s. He became well known for his role in Gary Henderson's play Skin Tight, which he performed hundreds of times over numerous tours. When it was performed at the Edinburgh Fringe Festival in 1998 it won the Scotsman Fringe First Award.

The first screen role Brophy played was in 1988 in Small War on the Edge of Town produced by the National Film Unit. He has been part of many screen and film projects with director Peter Jackson and associated digital company Weta.

Awards 
Nokia New Zealand Film Awards (2001) - Nominated for Best Performance in a Short Film: for Room Tone

Drifting Clouds Short Film Festival New Zealand (2000) - Best Actor: for Group Therapy

Chapman Tripp Theatre Awards (2009) - Best Actor for The Blackening by Paul Rothwell

Filmography

References

External links

1963 births
20th-century New Zealand male actors
21st-century New Zealand male actors
Living people
New Zealand male film actors
New Zealand people of Irish descent
People from Feilding

Toi Whakaari alumni